Sonograph is an EP released in 2004 by American band Early Day Miners.

Track listing
"Albatross" – 2:34
"Perish Room" – 4:49
"Bijou" – 4:18
"Bedroom, Houston" – 4:25
"Mosaic II" – 4:15
"Misrach" – 6:01

Personnel
Dan Burton: vocals, guitar
Joseph Brumley: guitar
Rory Leitch: drums
Matt Lindblom: bass

2004 EPs
Early Day Miners albums